Clubul Sportiv Municipal Focșani, commonly known as CSM Focșani, or simply Focșani, is a Romanian basketball club based in Focșani, currently participates in the Liga Națională, the top-tier league in Romania. The team represents the basketball section of CSM Focșani, a multi-sports club.

The club initially played in the second-tier Liga I. However, in 2018 the league was merged with the top-tier Liga Națională.

Current roster

References

External links
 Official website

2007 establishments in Romania
Basketball teams in Romania
Basketball teams established in 2007